Illya Serhiyovych Kvasnytsya (born 20 March 2003) is a Ukrainian professional footballer who plays as a Striker for Rukh Lviv.

Club career

Early years
Born in Doroshkivtsi, Chernivtsi Oblast, Kvasnytsya began his career in the local Bukovyna Chernivtsi youth sportive school, where his first coach was Yuriy Kraft. Then he continued in the Shakhtar Donetsk, Karpaty Lviv and the Rukh Lviv academies.

Rukh Lviv
In September 2020 he signed a contract with the Ukrainian Premier League side Rukh Lviv. He made his debut in the Ukrainian Premier League on 7 December 2022 as a second half-time substituted player in a home match against Chornomorets Odesa.

References

External links
 
 

2003 births
Living people
Sportspeople from Chernivtsi Oblast
Ukrainian footballers
Ukraine youth international footballers
Association football forwards
FC Rukh Lviv players
Ukrainian Premier League players